Cafius luteipennis is a species of large rove beetle in the family Staphylinidae. It can be found from British Columbia to Baja California.

References

Further reading

 

Staphylininae
Articles created by Qbugbot